Carlos Rodolfo Ambrosio (born 27 December 1961 in Córdoba) is an Argentine rugby union former player and a current coach. He played as a fly-half and as a centre.

Player career
He played for Tala Rugby Club, in Córdoba, Argentina. He was the first Italian-Argentine to play for Italy. He had 12 caps for Italy, from 1987 to 1989, scoring 1 try and 3 penalties, 13 points on aggregate. He was called for the 1987 Rugby World Cup, playing a single game in what was his debut for the Italian side, at the 70-6 loss to New Zealand, in Auckland, at 22 May 1987. He didn't score at his single presence at the competition. Ambrosio last game was at the 15-12 loss to the Soviet Union, in Moscow, at 5 November 1989, for the 1989-1990 FIRA Trophy.

Coach career
He returned to Argentina after finishing his player career, where he was head coach of Córdoba Rugby Club, from 1999 to 2000. He came back to Italy, where he was head coach of Petrarca Rugby, from 2002/03 to 2003/04, and Segni, from 2005/06 to 2006/07.
Moving back to Argentina, he was the director of the Federal Center of Development and High Performance of the province of Córdoba, from October 2008 to 2011, on behalf of the UAR. After his replacement by Francisco Rubio, he took over the direction of the federal technical sector of the youth.

He was the head coach of Argentina national under-20 rugby union team at the 2014 IRB Junior World Championship, finishing in 9th place.

In November 2014, he was announced as the new head coach of Brazil. He was in charge until 2019

References

External links

1961 births
Living people
Argentine rugby union players
Italian rugby union players
Italy international rugby union players
Argentine rugby union coaches
Italian rugby union coaches
Sportspeople from Córdoba, Argentina
Brazil national rugby union team coaches
Argentine expatriate sportspeople in Brazil
Argentine people of Italian descent
Petrarca Rugby players